Ammapalayam may refer to one of several villages in Tamil Nadu state in India:

 Ammapalayam, Dharmapuri, in Dharmapuri district
 Ammapalayam, Erode, in Erode district
 Ammapalayam, Salem, in Salem district